Three-Piece No. 3: Vertebrae (Working Model) is a bronze sculpture by Henry Moore. It was cast in 1968 as in edition of 8, along with an artist's copy which is now part of the Tate collection.

Description
It is in the Nasher Sculpture Center.
The sculpture refers to bones, which Moore collected.

See also
 Three Piece Sculpture: Vertebrae
 List of public art in Washington, D.C., Ward 2

References

External links

Waymarking
Working Model for Three Piece No. 3: Vertebrae

Sculptures by Henry Moore
1968 sculptures
Hirshhorn Museum and Sculpture Garden
Sculptures of the Smithsonian Institution
Abstract sculptures in Washington, D.C.
Bronze sculptures in Washington, D.C.
Outdoor sculptures in Washington, D.C.